A jib or jib arm is the horizontal or near-horizontal beam used in many types of crane to support the load clear of the main support. An archaic spelling is gib.

Usually jib arms are attached to a vertical mast or  tower or sometimes  to an inclined boom. In other jib-less designs such as derricks, the load is hung directly from a boom which is often anomalously called a jib.

A camera jib or jib arm in cinematography is a small crane that holds nothing but the camera.

References

Mechanical engineering